Broyhill may refer to:

Broyhill Furniture of Lenoir, North Carolina, United States
James Edgar Broyhill (1892–1988), founder of Broyhill Furniture
Jim Broyhill (1927–2023), American politician and U.S. Representative and Senator from the state of North Carolina, son of the above
Joel Broyhill (1919–2006), American politician and a Congressman from Virginia for 11 terms, from 1953 to 1974
Lincoln Broyhill (1925–2008), record-setting American tail-gunner in World War II and later a successful real estate developer

See also
M.T. Broyhill & Sons Corporation a Washington DC based building company, United States
Beroe Hill
Bray Hill
Bury Hill